The 2020–21 Elite One Championship was the 86th season of France's domestic rugby league competition and the 20th season known as the Elite One championship. There were ten teams in the league. Each team played 18 matches in the regular season. The top six teams progressed to the finals series.

There were no draws. In case of an equal score, the rule of the "Golden point" was applied.

Due to the COVID-19 pandemic, games were played behind closed doors.

Some games were televised on the free to air  TV regional channel ViàOccitanie. Yet, as this channel was facing economic difficulties, the clubs tend to broadcast their home games via the social networks.

Teams

Ladder 

At the end of the preliminary phase, the top two clubs qualified for the semi-finals.

The other ones played the Playoffs. The third and fourth best-placed clubs hosted the Elimination finals.

Source:

Playoffs

All playoffs games were broadcast on YouTube.

Grand Final

Media

Television 
Unlike, for instance,  the BBC, France Television didn't offer any program to the French public about Rugby League. This has been a real issue for the game. Explanations usually given are the low number of participants in France but also pressure which would be made by the Union authorities on the French Public Television Group.

In the early 2020s, some Elite 1 games are televised by a local channel ViàOccitanie; this is a free-to-air channel in the South of France but they are also available on the internet and via the triple play internet devices. Therefore, they offer, indirectly, a nationwide coverage of the domestic championship.

Presently, French clubs have to fund the broadcast of their own games or to  televise their own matches themselves via the social networks or YouTube.

Radio 
Radio Marseillette, a local Southern radio,  has rugby league debate and news every Saturday from 10:00 to 12:00. They also have commentary on some Elite League games.

Press 
The French national mainstream media barely follow the game. Very occasionally, some articles about the sport are published in newspapers such as  Le Monde, Le Figaro or the national Sport newspaper L'Équipe.

Nevertheless, there is undoubtedly a French specificity: the Weekly Rugby Union magazine Midi Olympique has a one-page section devoted to Rugby League. However,  only two local newspapers genuinely cover the game; L'Indépendant ( based in the South of France) and la Dépêche du Midi (based in the South west of the country).

The British Rugby League press cover this championship; for example magazines like Rugby Leaguer & League Express offer a weekly report of the games. In Australia, the monthly publication Rugby League Review offer a few columns about  the games as well.

See also 
 Rugby league in France
 French Rugby League Championship
 Elite One Championship

References 

Rugby league competitions in France
2020 in French rugby league
2021 in French rugby league